Edward Jean Steichen (March 27, 1879 – March 25, 1973) was a Luxembourgish American photographer, painter, and curator, renowned as one of the most prolific and influential figures in the history of photography.

Steichen was credited with transforming photography into an art form. His photographs appeared in Alfred Stieglitz's groundbreaking magazine Camera Work more often than anyone else during its publication run from 1903 to 1917. Stieglitz hailed him as "the greatest photographer that ever lived".

As a pioneer of fashion photography, Steichen's gown images for the magazine Art et Décoration in 1911 were the first modern fashion photographs to be published. From 1923 to 1938, Steichen served as chief photographer for the Condé Nast magazines Vogue and Vanity Fair, while also working for many advertising agencies, including J. Walter Thompson. During these years, Steichen was regarded as the most popular and highest-paid photographer in the world.

After the United States' entry into World War II, Steichen was invited by the United States Navy to serve as Director of the Naval Aviation Photographic Unit. In 1944, he directed the war documentary The Fighting Lady, which won the Academy Award for Best Documentary Feature at the 17th Academy Awards.

From 1947 to 1961, Steichen served as Director of the Department of Photography at New York's Museum of Modern Art. While there, he curated and assembled exhibits including The Family of Man, which was seen by nine million people. In 2003, the Family of Man photographic collection was added to UNESCO's Memory of the World Register in recognition of its historical value.

In February 2006, a print of Steichen's early pictorialist photograph, The Pond—Moonlight (1904), sold for US$2.9 million—at the time, the highest price ever paid for a photograph at auction. A print of another photograph of the same style, The Flatiron (1904), became the second most expensive photograph ever on November 8th, 2022, when it was sold for $12,000,000, at Christie's New York - well above the original estimate of $2,000,000-$3,000,000.

Early life

Steichen was born Éduard Jean Steichen on March 27, 1879 in a small house in the village of Bivange, Luxembourg, the son of Jean-Pierre and Marie Kemp Steichen. His parents facing increasingly straitened circumstances and financial difficulties, decided to make a new start and emigrated to the United States when Steichen was eighteen months old. Jean-Pierre Steichen immigrated in 1880, with Marie Steichen bringing the infant Éduard along after Jean-Pierre had settled in Hancock in Michigan's Upper Peninsula copper country. According to noted Steichen biographer, Penelope Niven, the Steichens were “part of a large exodus of Luxembourgers displaced in the late nineteenth century by worsening economic conditions.”

Éduard's sister and only sibling, Lilian Steichen, was born in Hancock on May 1, 1883. She would later marry poet Carl Sandburg, whom she met at the Milwaukee Social Democratic Party office in 1907. Her marriage to Sandburg the following year helped forge a life-long friendship and partnership between her brother and Sandburg.

By 1889, when Éduard was 10, his parents had saved up enough money to move the family to Milwaukee. There he learned German and English at school, while continuing to speak Luxembourgish at home.

In 1894, at fifteen, Steichen began attending Pio Nono College, a Catholic boys' high school, where his artistic talents were noticed. His drawings in particular were said to show promise. He quit high school to begin a four-year lithography apprenticeship with the American Fine Art Company of Milwaukee. After hours, he would sketch and draw, and he began to teach himself painting. Having discovered a camera shop near his work, he visited frequently until he persuaded himself to buy his first camera, a secondhand Kodak box "detective" camera, in 1895. Steichen and his friends who were also interested in drawing and photography pooled their funds, rented a small room in a Milwaukee, WI office building, and began calling themselves the Milwaukee Art Students League. The group hired Richard Lorenz and Robert Schade for occasional lectures. In 1899, Steichen's photographs were exhibited in the second Philadelphia Photographic Salon.

Steichen became a U.S. citizen in 1900 and signed the naturalization papers as Edward J. Steichen, but he continued to use his birth name of Éduard until after the First World War.

Career

Paris, New York, and Partnerships with Stieglitz and Rodin

In April 1900, Steichen left Milwaukee for Paris to study art. Clarence H. White thought Steichen and Alfred Stieglitz should meet, and thus produced an introduction letter for Steichen, and Steichen —then en route to Paris from his home in Milwaukee— met Stieglitz in New York City in early 1900. In that first meeting, Stieglitz expressed praise for Steichen's background in painting and bought three of Steichen's photographic prints.

In 1902, when Stieglitz was formulating what would become Camera Work, he asked Steichen to design the logo for the magazine with a custom typeface. Steichen was the most frequently shown photographer in the journal.

Steichen began experimenting with color photography in 1904 and was one of the earliest in the United States to use the Autochrome Lumière process. In 1905, Stieglitz and Steichen created the Little Galleries of the Photo-Secession, in what had been Steichen's portrait studio; it eventually became known as the 291 Gallery after its address. It presented some of the first American exhibitions of Auguste Rodin, Henri Matisse, Paul Cézanne, Pablo Picasso, and Constantin Brâncuși.

According to author and art historian William A. Ewing, Steichen became one of the earliest "jet setters", constantly moving back and forth between Europe and the U.S. by steamship, in the process cross-pollinating art from Europe to the United States, helping to define photography as an art form, and at the same time widening America's understanding of European art and art in general.

Pioneering fashion photography

Fashion photography began with engravings reproduced from photographs of modishly-dressed actresses by Leopold-Emile Reutlinger, Nadar and others in the 1890s. After high-quality half-tone reproduction of photographs became possible, most credit as pioneers of the genre goes to the French Baron Adolph de Meyer and to Steichen who, borrowing his friend's hand-camera in 1907, candidly photographed dazzlingly-dressed ladies at the Longchamp Racecourse Fashion then was being photographed for newspaper supplements and fashion magazines, particularly by the Frères Séeberger, as it was worn at Paris horse-race meetings by aristocracy and hired models.

In 1911, Lucien Vogel, the publisher of Jardin des Modes and La Gazette du Bon Ton, challenged Steichen to promote fashion as a fine art through photography. Steichen took photos of gowns designed by couturier Paul Poiret, which were published in the April 1911 issue of the magazine Art et Décoration. Two were in colour, and appeared next to flat, stylised, yellow-and-black Georges Lepape drawings of accessories, fabrics, and girls.

Steichen himself, in his 1963 autobiography, asserted that his 1911 Art et Décoration photographs "were probably the first serious fashion photographs ever made," a generalised claim since repeated by many commentators. What he (and de Meyer) did bring was an artistic approach; a soft-focus, aesthetically retouched Pictorialist style that was distinct from the mechanically sharp images made by his commercial colleagues for half-tone reproduction, and that he and the publishers and fashion designers for whom he worked appreciated as a marketable idealisation of the garment, beyond the exact description of fabrics and buttonholes.

After World War I, during which he commanded the photographic division of the American Expeditionary Forces, he gradually reverted to straight photography for his fashion photography and was hired by Condé Nast in 1923 for the extraordinary salary of $35,000 (equivalent to over $500,000 in 2019 value).

World War II

At the commencement of World War II, Steichen, then in his sixties, had retired as a full-time photographer. He was developing new varieties of delphinium, which in 1936 had been the subject of his first exhibition at the Museum of Modern Art, and the only flower exhibition ever held there.

When the United States joined the global conflict, Steichen, who had come out of the first World War an Army Colonel, was refused for active service because of his age. Later, invited by the Navy to serve as Director of the Naval Aviation Photographic Unit, he was commissioned a Lieutenant-Commander in January 1942. Steichen selected for his unit six officer-photographers from the industry (sometimes irreverently called "Steichen's chickens"), including photographers Wayne Miller and Charles Fenno Jacobs. A collection of 172 silver gelatin photographs taken by the Unit under his leadership is held at the Harry Ransom Center at the University of Texas at Austin. Their war documentary The Fighting Lady, directed by Steichen, won the Academy Award for Best Documentary Feature at the 17th Academy Awards.

In 1942, Steichen curated for the Museum of Modern Art the exhibition Road to Victory, five duplicates of which toured the world. Photographs in the exhibition were credited to enlisted members of the Navy, Coast Guard, and Marine Corps and numbers by Steichen's unit, while many were anonymous and some were made by automatic cameras in Navy planes operated while firing at the enemy. This was followed in January 1945 by Power in the Pacific: Battle Photographs of our Navy in Action on the Sea and In the Sky. Steichen was released from Active Duty (under honorable conditions) on December 13, 1945, at the rank of Captain. For his service during World War II, he was awarded the World War II Victory Medal, Asiatic-Pacific Campaign Medal (with 2 campaign stars), American Campaign Medal, and numerous other awards.

Museum of Modern Art

In the summer of 1929, Museum of Modern Art director Alfred H. Barr, Jr. had included a department devoted to photography in a plan presented to the Trustees. Though not put in place until 1940, it became the first department of photography in a museum devoted to twentieth-century art and was headed by Beaumont Newhall. On the strength of attendances of his propaganda exhibitions Road to Victory and Power in the Pacific, and precipitating curator Newhall's resignation along with most of his staff, in 1947 Steichen was appointed Director of Photography until 1962, later assisted by Grace M. Mayer.

His appointment was protested by many who saw him as anti-art photography, one of the most vocal being Ansel Adams who on April 29, 1946, wrote a letter to Stephen Clark (copied to Newhall) to express his disappointment over Steichen's hiring for the new position of director; “To supplant Beaumont Newhall, who has made such a great contribution to the art through his vast knowledge and sympathy for the medium, with a regime which is inevitably favorable to the spectacular and 'popular' is indeed a body blow to the progress of creative photography.”

Nevertheless, Ansel Adams' image Moonrise, Hernandez, New Mexico was first published in U.S. Camera Annual 1943, after being selected by Steichen, who was serving as judge for the publication. This gave Moonrise an audience before its first formal exhibition at the Museum of Modern Art in 1944.

Steichen as director held a strong belief in the local product, of the "liveness of the melting pot of American photography,’’ and worked to expand and organise the collection, inspiring and recognising the 1950s generation while keeping historical shows to a minimum. He worked with Robert Frank even before his The Americans was published, exhibited the early work of Harry Callahan and Aaron Siskind, and purchased two Rauschenberg prints in 1952, ahead of any museum. Steichen also kept international developments in his scope and held shows and made important acquisitions from Europe and Latin America, occasionally visiting those countries to do so. Three books were published by the Department during his tenure (The Family of Man, Steichen the Photographer, and The Bitter Years: 1935–1941: Rural America as Seen by the Photographers of the Farm Security Administration). Despite his solid career in photography, Steichen displayed his own work at MoMA—his retrospective, Steichen the Photographer—only after he had already announced his retirement in 1961.

Among accomplishments that were to redeem initial resentment at his appointment, Steichen created The Family of Man, a world-touring Museum of Modern Art exhibition that, while arguably a product of American Cold War propaganda, was seen by 9 million visitors and still holds the record for most-visited photography exhibit. Now permanently housed and on continuous display in Clervaux (Luxembourgish: Klierf) Castle in northern Luxembourg, his country of birth, Steichen regarded the exhibition as the "culmination of his career.". Comprising over 500 photos that depicted life, love and death in 68 countries, the prologue for its widely purchased catalogue was written by Steichen's brother-in-law, Carl Sandburg. As had been Steichen's wish, the exhibition was donated to the Grand Duchy of Luxembourg, his country of birth.

MoMA exhibitions curated or directed by Steichen
The following are exhibitions curated or directed by Steichen during his tenure as Director of Photography at The Museum of Modern Art:

 1947: Three Young Photographers: Leonard McCombe, Wayne F. Miller, Homer Page, September 30–December 7
 1948: In and Out of Focus: A Survey of Today's Photography. “A survey of photography today, including prints by 76 photographers from many parts of the country, the first large exhibition organized by Captain Edward J. Steichen, Director of the Museum's Department of Photography”, April 6–July 11 
 1948: 50 Photographs by 50 Photographers. “50 prints from the Museum Collections that form an abbreviated history of the development of pictorial photography during the past 100 years.” July 27–September 26
 1948: Photo-Secession (American Photography 1902–1910), September 29–November 28
 1948/1949 Photographs by Bill Brandt, Harry Callahan, Ted Croner, Lisette Model, November 30, 1948–February 10
 1949: This Exact Instant, Events And Pages in 100 Years of News Photography, February 8–May 1
 1949: Roots of Photography, comprising works by Hill and Adamson, Julia Margaret Cameron and Henry Fox Talbot, April 26–July 24
 1949: Realism in Photography. Works by Ralph Steiner, Wayne F. Miller, Tosh Matsumoto, Frederick Sommer, July 26–September 25
 1949: Photographs by Margaret Bourke-White, Helen Levitt, Dorothea Lange, Tana Hoban, Esther Bubley, and Hazel-Frieda Larsen. “Sixty prints by 6 women photographers” October 11–November 15
 1950: Roots of French Photography, November 29, 1949–January 15
 1950: Photographs of Picasso by Gjon Mili and by Robert Capa, January 24–March 19,
 1950: Photography Recent Acquisitions: Stieglitz, Atget, March 28–May 7,
 1950: Color Photography, May 9–July 4,
 1950: Photographs by 51 Photographers, August 1–September 17,
 1950: Photographs by Lewis Carroll, September 26–December 3,
 1951: Korea - The Impact of War in Photographs, February 13–April 22,
 1951: Abstraction in Photography, May 1–July 4,
 1951: 12 Photographers, July 12–August 12,
 1951: Forgotten Photographers, August 23–November 4,
 1951: Memorable 'Life' Photographs, November 20–December 12,
 1952: Christmas Photographs, November 29, 1951–January 6,
 1952: Five French Photographers, December 18, 1951–February 24,
 1952: We Create for Pleasure, January 23–March 2,
 1952: Diogenes with a Camera, May 20–September 1,
 1952: Then and Now, August 5–18,
 1953: Always the Young Strangers, February 26–April 1,
 1953: Postwar European Photography, May 26–August 23,
 1955: The Family of Man, January 24–May 8,
 1956: Diogenes with a Camera III, January 17–March 18,
 1956: Diogenes with a Camera IV, April 4–June 3,
 1956/7: Language of the Wall: Parisian Graffiti Photographed by Brassaï, October 24, 1956 – January 13, 1957
 1958: 70 Photographers Look at New York, November 27, 1957–April 15, in collaboration with Grace Mayer
 1959: Photographs from the Museum Collection, November 26, 1958–January 18,
 1960: Photographs for Collectors, October 1–16, “Photographs for Collectors, more than 250 prints by 66 photographers…priced at $25 and up, in color or in black and white, some framed for hanging. Styles range from photo-journalism to abstraction…and…familiar classics of photography
1962: Photographs by Harry Callahan and Robert Frank, January 30–April 1
 1962: 50 Photographs by 50 Photographers, April 3–May 15,
 1962: The Bitter Years: 1935–1941, October 18–November 25, selected by Steichen (described in the press release as ‘Director Emeritus’) from 270,000 taken for the F.S.A., assisted by picture researcher Davis Pratt for an installation designed by Kathleen Haven.

In the latter years of his tenure after her appointment by Steichen as Assistant Curator, it was Grace Mayer, 'overseen' by Steichen, who selected and organized the shows Recent Acquisitions (December 21, 1960 – February 5, 1961), 1960: The Sense of Abstraction, February 17–April 10, Steichen the Photographer (March 28–May 30, 1961), A Bid For Space (4 installations, 1960 to 1963), Diogenes with a Camera V (September 26–November 12, 1961), and Walker Evans: American Photographs (June 8, 1962 – February 14, 1963).

Steichen hired John Szarkowski to be his successor at the Museum of Modern Art on July 1, 1962. On his appointment, Szarkowski promoted Mayer to Curator.

Later life
On December 6, 1963, Steichen was presented with the Presidential Medal of Freedom by U.S. President Lyndon B. Johnson.

Though then 88 years old and unable to attend in person, in 1967 Steichen, as a still-active member of the copyright committee of the American Society of Magazine Photographers, wrote a submission to the U.S. Senate hearings to support copyright law revisions, requesting that "this young giant among the visual arts be given equal rights by having its peculiar problems taken into account."

In 1968 the Edward Steichen Archive was established in MoMA's Department of Photography. The Museum's then-Director René d’Harnoncourt declared that its function was to "amplify and clarify the meaning of Steichen’s contribution to the art of photography, and to modern art generally.” Creator of the Archive was Grace M. Mayer, who in 1959 started her career as an assistant to the director, Steichen, and who became Curator of Photography in 1962, retiring in 1968. Mayer returned after her retirement to serve in a voluntary capacity as Curator of the Edward Steichen Archive until the mid-1980s to source materials by, about, and related to Steichen. Her detailed card catalogs are housed in the Museum's Grace M. Mayer Papers.

Steichen's 90th birthday was marked with a dinner gathering of photographers, editors, writers, and museum professionals at the Plaza Hotel in 1969. The event was hosted by MoMA trustee Henry Allen Moe, and U.S. Camera magazine publisher Tom Maloney.

In 1970, an evening show was presented in Arles during The Rencontres d'Arles festival: "Edward Steichen, photographe" by Martin Boschet.

Steichen bought a farm that he called Umpawaug in 1928, just outside West Redding, Connecticut. He lived there until his death on March 25, 1973, two days before his 94th birthday. After his death, Steichen's farm was made into a park, known as Topstone Park. As of 2018, Topstone Park was open seasonally.

In 1974 Steichen was posthumously inducted into the International Photography Hall of Fame and Museum.

Legacy

Steichen's career, especially his activities at MoMA, did much to popularise and promote the medium, and both before and since his death photography, including his own, continued to appreciate as a collectible art form.

In February 2006, a print of Steichen's early pictorialist photograph, The Pond—Moonlight (1904), sold for what was then the highest price ever paid for a photograph at auction, .

Steichen took the photograph in Mamaroneck, New York, near the home of his friend, art critic Charles Caffin. It shows a wooded area and pond, with moonlight appearing between the trees and reflecting on the pond. While the print appears to be a color photograph, the first true color photographic process, the autochrome process, was not available until 1907. Steichen created the impression of color by manually applying layers of light-sensitive gums to the paper. Only three prints of the Pond—Moonlight are still known to exist and, as a result of the hand-layering of the gums, each is unique. (The two prints not auctioned are held in museum collections.) The extraordinary sale price of the print is in part attributable to its one-of-a-kind character and to its rarity.

A show of early color photographs by Steichen was held at the Mudam (Musée d'Art moderne) in Luxembourg City from July 14 to September 3, 2007.

Personal life
Steichen married Clara E. Smith (1875–1952) in 1903. They had two daughters, Mary Rose Steichen (1904-1998) and Charlotte "Kate" Rodina Steichen (1908-1988). In 1914, Clara accused her husband of having an affair with artist Marion H. Beckett, who was staying with them in France. The Steichens left France just ahead of invading German troops. In 1915, Clara Steichen returned to France with her daughter Kate, staying in their house in the Marne in spite of the war. Steichen returned to France with the Photography Division of the American Army Signal Corps in 1917, whereupon Clara returned to the United States. In 1919, Clara Steichen sued Marion Beckett for having an affair with her husband, but was unable to prove her claims. Clara and Edward Steichen eventually divorced in 1922.

Steichen married Dana Desboro Glover in 1923. She died of leukemia in 1957.

In 1960, aged 80, Steichen married 27-year-old Joanna Taub and remained married to her until his death, two days before his 94th birthday. Joanna Steichen died on July 24, 2010, in Montauk, New York, aged 77.

Exhibitions

Solo

 1900 Photo Club. Paris
 1900 Mrs. Arthur Robinson Home. Milwaukee (USA)
 1901 La Maison des Artistes, Paris
 1902 Photo-Club, Paris
 1902 Eduard Steichen, Paintings and Photographs; Maison des artistes; Paris, France
 1905 Photo-Secession Gallery,  New York
 1906 Photographs by Eduard Steichen; Little Galleries of the Photo-Secession (291 Gallery); New York, New York
 1908 Eduard Steichen, Photographs in Monochrome and Color; Little Galleries of the Photo-Secession; New York, New York
 1909 Photo-Secession Gallery,  New York
 1910 Photo-Secession Gallery,  New York
 1910 Montross Gallery. London
 1910 Little Gallery. New York City (USA)
 1915 M. Knoedler & Company, New York (USA)
 1938 Museum of Modern Art, New York ( USA )
 1938 Edward Steichen; Baltimore Museum of Art; Baltimore, Maryland
 1938 Retrospective, Baltimore Museum of Art (USA)
 1950 Edward Steichen, Retrospective; American Institute of Architects Headquarters; Washington, D.C.
 1961 Steichen the Photographer; Museum of Modern Art; New York, New York
 1965 Retrospective, Bibliothèque Nationale, Paris
 1976 Allan Frumkin Gallery. Chicago (USA)
 1978 Museum of Modern Art. New York (USA)
 1979 George Eastman House, Rochester ( USA)
 2000 Edward Steichen; Whitney Museum of American Art; New York, New York
 2002 Edward Steichen: Art as Advertising/ Advertising as Art; Norsk Museum for Fotografi-Preus Fotomuseum; Horten, Norway
 2004: Hollywood Celebrities: Edward Steichen, Kunsthal Rotterdam, Netherlands, 17 Jan – 25 Apr
 2005: Edward Steichen, Botschaft von Luxemburg, Germany, 22 Apr – 21 May
 2005: Hollywood Celebrity: Edward Steichen’s Vanity Fair Portraits, Multimedia Art Museum, Russia, 14 Mar – 14 May
 2007: Steichen; une épopée photographique, Jeu de Paume, France, 9 Oct – 30 Dec
 2008: Edward Steichen, Palazzo Magnani, Italy, 30 Apr – 8 Jun
 2008: Edward Steichen: Lives in Photography / Une épopée photographique, Musée de l'Elysée, Switzerland, 18 Jan – 24 Mar
 2008: Edward Steichen: Une Epopée Photographique, Museo Nacional Centro de Arte Reina Sofia, Spain, 25 Jun – 22 Sep
 2008 Edward Steichen: In High Fashion 1923-1937, Kunsthaus Zürich, Switzerland, 11 Jan – 30 Mar
 2009: Edward Steichen: 1915-1923, Howard Greenberg Gallery, USA, 20 Mar – 16 May
 2009: Edward Steichen: In High Fashion, Kunstmuseum Wolfsburg, Germany, 11 Oct 2008 – 2 Jan
 2009: Edward Steichen: In High Fashion the Condé Nast Years,  1923–1937, Williams College Museum of Art, USA, 6 Jun – 8 Nov
 2009: Edward Steichen: In High Fashion,  The Condé Nast Years,  1923–1937, International Center of Photography, USA, 16 Jan – 3 May
 2009: Edward Steichen: The Early Years, Museum of Photographic Arts, USA, 31 Jan – 17 May
 2009/10: Edward Steichen. In High Fashion,  the Condé Nast Years,  1923–1937, AGO Art Gallery Ontario,  Canada, Canada, 26 Sep 2009 – 3 Jan 2010
 2011: Edward Steichen: Celebrity Design, Museum Folkwang, Germany, 6 Nov 2010 – 16 Jan
 2011: Edward Steichen: The Last Printing, Danziger Gallery, USA, 15 Sep – 29 Oct
 2012: Edward Steichen: gli anni Condé Nast, Fondazione Sozzani, Italy, 20 Nov 2011 – 12 Feb
 2013: Edward Steichen, Museum of Photography, Denmark, 12 Oct 2012 – 9 Feb
 2013: In High Fashion: the Condé Nast Years, 1923–1937, foam Fotografiemuseum Netherlands, 28 Jun – 6 Sep
 2013: Modern Age Light and Shadow: 1923-1937, Setagaya Art Museum, Japan, 26 Jan – 7 Apr
 2013: Talk of the Town: Portraits by Edward Steichen from the Hollander Collection, LACMA Museum, USA, 3 Aug – 8 Dec
 2014:  Sharp, Clear Pictures. Edward Steichen's World War I and Condé Nast Years, Art Institute of Chicago, USA, 28 Jun – 28 Sep
 2014: Edward Steichen & Art Deco Fashion, National Gallery of Victoria, Australia, 18 Oct 2013 – 2 Mar
 2014: Steichen in the 1920s and 1930s: A Recent Acquisition, Whitney Museum Art, USA, 6 Dec 2013 – 1 Aug
 2014/ 2015: In High Fashion: Edward Steichen, The Conde Nast Years 1923 - 1937, Photographers' Gallery UK, 31 Oct 2014 – 18 Jan 2015
 2015: Edward Steichen, Galerie Clairefontaine, Luxembourg, 8 Sep – 17 Oct
 2015: Edward Steichen In High Fashion. The Condé Nast Years. 1923-1937, Multimedia Art Museum, Russia, 9 Sep – 22 Nov
 2015: In High Fashion: Edward Steichen, WestLicht, Austria, 18 Feb – 24 May
 2016 Making Meaning of a Legacy: Edward Steichen, Centre for Fine Arts - Bozar, Belgium, 13 Nov 2015 – 5 Jan
 2017: Twentieth-Century Photographer Edward Steichen, DeCordova Museum, US, 7 Oct 2016 – 26 Mar

Group

 1900 The New School of American Photography; Royal Photographic Society; London, England and Paris, France
 1902 American Pictorial Photography; National Arts Club; New York, New York.
 1904 Salon International de Photographie, Paris.
 1905 Opening Exhibition; Little Galleries of the Photo Secession; New York, New York.
 1906 Photographs Arranged by the Photo Secession; Pennsylvania Academy of Fine Arts; Philadelphia, Pennsylvania
 1910 The Younger American Painters; Little Galleries of the Photo-Secession; New York, New York.
 1910 International Exhibit of Pictorial Photography; Albright Art Gallery; Rochester, New York
 1932 Murals by American Painters and Photographers; Museum of Modern Art; New York, New York
 1955 The Family of Man, MOMA, New York (USA)

Bibliography

 Steichen, Edward (1955). The Family of Man: The Greatest Photographic Exhibition of All Time. New York: Maco Pub. Co for the Museum of Modern Art.
 
 

 DePietro, Anne Cohen (1985). The Paintings of Eduard Steichen. Huntington, NY: The Heckscher Museum.  (Exhibition Catalog).
 Sandeen, Eric J. (1995). Picturing an Exhibition: The Family of Man and 1950's America. University of New Mexico Press.
 
 
 
 Niven, Penelope (1997). Steichen: A Biography. New York: Clarkson Potter. .
 Smith, Joel (1999). Edward Steichen: The Early Years. Princeton, NJ: Princeton University Press.
 
 Haskell, Barbara (2000). Edward Steichen. New York: Whitney Museum of American Art.
 
 DePietro, Anne Cohen; Goley, Mary Anne (2003). Eduard Steichen: Four Paintings in Context.Hollis Taggart Galleries.
 Mitchell, Emily (2007). The Last Summer of the World. Norton. (A fictional narrative about Steichen.)

Gallery

References

External links

Edward Steichen official website
Works by Edward Steichen at the George Eastman Museum
The Steichen Family Papers at the Beinecke Rare Book & Manuscript Library, Yale University
Works by Edward Steichen - Oochens Series at the National Gallery of Art
Steichen Collection at the Musée National d'Histoire et d'Art, Luxembourg
The Family of Man at Clervaux Castle, Luxembourg
Works by Edward Steichen - The Bitter Years at Waasertuerm Gallery, Luxembourg
Carl Sandburg Home, North Carolina from the National Park Service
Mary Steichen Calderone Papers at Schlesinger Library, Harvard University
Rodin and Steichen at Musee Rodin
Grace M. Mayer Papers at Museum of Modern Art
Alfred Stieglitz Collection at The Metropolitan Museum of Art, New York
Carl Sandburg Papers at University of Illinois
American Expeditionary Force Photo Section (Steichen) Collection 1917-1919 at Smithsonian, National Air and Space Museum
Edward J. Steichen World War II Navy Photographs Collection, 1941-1945 at Smithsonian, National Air and Space Museum
Works by Edward Steichen at the International Center of Photography
Alfred Stieglitz Collection at The Art Institute of Chicago
—David Joseph (DJ) Marcou's cover-story Edward Steichen, HonFRPS: Renaissance Man in March 2004 RPS Journal, pp. 72–75.
"From Luxembourg and America to the World: Edward Steichen's Photographic Legacy" at La Crosse History Unbound
Works by Edward Steichen at the Museum of Modern Art

1879 births
1973 deaths
American art curators
Photography critics
Photography curators
Fashion photographers
American portrait photographers
War photographers
Photographers from New York (state)
Artists from New York City
People associated with the Museum of Modern Art (New York City)
Vanity Fair (magazine) people
Vogue (magazine) people
Académie Julian alumni
Luxembourgian emigrants to the United States
20th-century American photographers
People from Redding, Connecticut
Presidential Medal of Freedom recipients